Karimpoocha is a 1981 Indian Malayalam horror film, directed and produced by Baby. The film stars Ratheesh, Seema, Jagathy Sreekumar, Jose Prakash and Meena in the lead roles. The film's score was composed by K. J. Joy.

Cast
Ratheesh as Joy
Seema as Leena
Jagathy Sreekumar as Pappu
Jose Prakash as Cheriyachan
Meena as Annamma
 Johny
 Charuhasan as Priest
 VKB Menon as Satheesh
 Vallathol Unnikrishnan
 Thodupuzha Radhakrishnan as Kriyachan
 Kundani Satheerthyan

Soundtrack
The music was composed by K. J. Joy and the lyrics were written by Poovachal Khader.

References

External links
 

1981 films
1980s Malayalam-language films
Films scored by K. J. Joy
Films directed by Baby (director)